Monkeywrench Records is an independent United States–based record label, located in Seattle, Washington. The label was founded by members of the alternative rock band Pearl Jam in 2009, following the end of the band's deal with J Records.

External links

Alternative rock record labels
Record labels established in 2009
Pearl Jam
Companies based in Seattle
Universal Music Group